The book  or  (Swedish and Latin, respectively, for "Swedish spiders") is one of the major works of the Swedish arachnologist and entomologist Carl Alexander Clerck and was first published in Stockholm in the year 1757. It was the first comprehensive book on the spiders of Sweden and one of the first regional monographs of a group of animals worldwide. The full title of the work is  – , ("Swedish spiders into their main genera separated, and as sixty and a few particular species described and with illuminated figures illustrated") and included 162 pages of text (eight pages were unpaginated) and six colour plates. It was published in Swedish, with a Latin translation printed in a slightly smaller font below the Swedish text.

Clerck described in detail 67 species of Swedish spiders, and for the first time in a zoological work consistently applied binomial nomenclature as proposed by Carl Linnaeus. Linnaeus had originally invented this system for botanical names in his 1753 work Species Plantarum, and presented it again in 1758 in the 10th edition of his work Systema Naturae for more than 4,000 animal species. Svenska Spindlar is the only pre-Linnaean source to be recognised as a taxonomic authority for such names.

Presentation of the spiders 

Clerck explained in the last (9th of the 2nd part) chapter of his work that in contrast to previous authors he used the term "spider" in the strict sense, for animals possessing eight eyes and separated prosoma and opisthosoma, and that his concept of this group of animals did not include Opiliones (because they had two eyes and a broadly joined prosoma and opisthosoma) and other groups of arachnids.

For all spiders Clerck used a single generic name (Araneus), to which was added a specific name which consisted of only one word. Each species was presented in the Swedish text with their Latin scientific names, followed by detailed information containing the exact dates when he had found the animals, and a detailed description of eyes, legs and body. The differences between the sexes were also described. Each species was illustrated in impressively accurate drawings printed on coloured copper plates which were bound at the end of the volume.

Impact and importance of the work 
Because of the exceptionally thorough treatment of the spider species, the scientific names proposed by Clerck (which were adopted by Carl Linnaeus in his Systema Naturae in 1758 with only minor modifications) had traditionally been recognized by arachnologists as binomial and available. In 1959 the ICZN Commission decided that Clerck's work should be available for zoological nomenclature, but the International Code of Zoological Nomenclature did not mention Clerck's work. Only after 1999 was this officially recognized in the Code. This means that in case of doubt the spelling of a spider name as from Clerck's 1757 work has priority over that proposed by Linnaeus in 1758 (an example is Araneus instead of Aranea), and that Clerck's spiders were the first animals in modern zoology to have obtained an available scientific name in the Linnean system.

Year 1757 or 1758? 
In the late 1800s, Clerck's 1757 work was commonly accepted as the first application of binomial nomenclature to spiders. In 1959 the ICZN Commission ruled that the date 1758 should be used for Clerck's names, this date 1758 was repeated to apply to Clerck's names in the 4th edition of the International Code of Zoological Nomenclature in 1999.

In a complete binomial name with author and year, the year corresponds to the year of publication of the original source. Since 2000, the ICZN Code includes an exception of this very basic rule. From the beginning on the new provision in the Code has been misunderstood by many researchers who believed that by setting the date for Clerck's work to 1758 (overriding its true date 1757) and the date for Systema Naturae to 1 January 1758, the priority was changed. In 2007, a case was even brought before the Commission because the researchers were no longer sure whether the generic name should be Araneus Clerck or Aranea Linnaeus. In their judgement the year 1758 for Clerck's Svenska Spindlar could be interpreted in a way that the Linnean work from 1 January 1758 should have priority. In 2009 the Commission saw itself forced to repeat once more, although this was already explicit in the Code's Article 3.1, that the name Araneus established by Clerck shall have priority and be used for the genus.

Species
Svenska Spindlar lists the following 67 species of spider; their current identities follow Platnick (2000–2010).

Chapter 2 (Araneidae, Tetragnathidae)
Araneus angulatus
Araneus diadematus
Araneus quadratus
Araneus marmoreus
Araneus umbraticus – Nuctenea umbratica
Araneus pyramidatus – Araneus marmoreus
Araneus ocellatus – Larinioides patagiatus
Araneus patagiatus – Larinioides patagiatus
Araneus cornutus – Larinioides cornutus
Araneus sericatus – Larinioides sclopetarius
Araneus sclopetarius – Larinioides sclopetarius
Araneus cucurbitinus – Araniella cucurbitina
Araneus segmentatus – Metellina segmentata
Araneus litera x notatus – Zygiella x-notata

Chapter 3 (Theridiidae, Nesticidae, Linyphiidae)
Araneus castaneus – Steatoda castanea
Araneus hamatus – Singa hamata
Araneus lunatus – Parasteatoda lunata
Araneus sisyphius – Phylloneta sisyphia
Araneus formosus – Parasteatoda lunata
Araneus ovatus – Enoplognatha ovata
Araneus redimitus – Enoplognatha ovata
Araneus lineatus – Enoplognatha ovata
Araneus cellulanus – Nesticus cellulanus
Araneus bucculentus – Floronia bucculenta
Araneus montanus – Neriene montana
Araneus triangularis – Linyphia triangularis

Chapter 4 (Agelenidae, Clubionidae)
Araneus domesticus – Tegenaria domestica, Malthonica ferruginea
Araneus labyrinthicus – Agelena labyrinthica
Araneus pallidulus – Clubiona pallidula

Chapter 5 (Lycosidae, Pisauridae)
Araneus fabrilis – Alopecosa fabrilis
Araneus aculeatus – Alopecosa aculeata
Araneus inquilinus – Alopecosa inquilina
Araneus lignarius – Acantholycosa lignaria
Araneus monticola – Pardosa monticola
Araneus pulverulentus – Alopecosa pulverulenta
Araneus paludicola – Pardosa paludicola
Araneus amentatus – Pardosa amentata
Araneus trabalis – Alopecosa trabalis
Araneus cuneatus – Alopecosa cuneata
Araneus undatus – Dolomedes fimbriatus
Araneus nivalis – Alopecosa inquilina
Araneus piraticus – Pirata piraticus
Araneus piscatorius – Pirata piscatorius
Araneus fumigatus – Pardosa amentata
Araneus pullatus – Pardosa pullata
Araneus plantarius – Dolomedes plantarius
Araneus fimbriatus – Dolomedes fimbriatus
Araneus mirabilis – Pisaura mirabilis

Chapter 6 (Salticidae)
Araneus hastatus – Dendryphantes hastatus
Araneus muscosus – Marpissa muscosa
Araneus scenicus – Salticus scenicus
Araneus striatus – [nomen dubium]
Araneus terebratus – Sitticus terebratus
Araneus litera v insignitus – Aelurillus v-insignitus
Araneus litera v notatus – Aelurillus v-insignitus
Araneus flammatus – [nomen dubium]
Araneus falcatus – Evarcha falcata
Araneus arcuatus – Evarcha arcuata

Chapter 7 (Thomisidae, Philodromidae, Sparassidae)
Araneus vatius – Misumena vatia
Araneus margaritatus – Philodromus margaritatus
Araneus aureolus – Philodromus aureolus
Araneus formicinus – Thanatus formicinus
Araneus cristatus – Xysticus cristatus
Araneus roseus – Micrommata virescens
Araneus virescens – Micrommata virescens

Chapter 8 (Cybaeidae)
Araneus aquaticus - Argyroneta aquatica

Footnotes

References 

Arachnological literature
Biological classification
Zoological nomenclature
1757 books
Zoology books
Carl Linnaeus
Biological systems
1757 in science
Swedish books